The 2021–22 Egyptian Super Cup was the 19th Egyptian Super Cup, an annual football match between the winners of the previous season's Egyptian Premier League and Egypt Cup. The match is usually contested by the winners of the Premier League and the Egypt Cup, but since Zamalek won the double (2020–21 Egyptian Premier League and 2020–21 Egypt Cup), Al Ahly qualified by default as the runners-up of the cup. The match was played on 28 October 2022 and for the fifth time in the United Arab Emirates at the Hazza Bin Zayed Stadium in Al Ain, Abu Dhabi. Al Ahly won the match 2–0.

Details

References 

Egyptian Super Cup
2020–21 in Egyptian football
Zamalek SC matches
Al Ahly SC matches